Bhava or Bhavayavya was a king who lived on the banks of the Indus, eulogized in RV 1.126. His son "Savanya" or "Bhavya" is the subject of 1.125, where he has a discussion with a wandering priest. The two hymns are among the very few dedicated to mortals in the Rigveda.

Rigveda
Mythological Indian monarchs